The 2008 CONCACAF Men's Olympic Qualification was the twelfth edition of the CONCACAF Men's Olympic Qualifying, the quadrennial, international, age-restricted football tournament organized by CONCACAF to determine which men's under-23 national teams from the North, Central America and Caribbean region qualify for the Olympic football tournament. It was held in the United States, from 11 and 23 March 2008.

Honduras won the title after with a 1–0 win over the United States in the final. As the top two teams, Honduras and the United States both qualified for the 2008 Summer Olympics in China as the CONCACAF representatives.

Qualification

Qualified teams
The following teams qualified for the final tournament.

1 Only final tournament.

Venues
Three cities served as the venues for the tournament.

Squads

Group stage

Group A

Group B

Knockout stage

Bracket

Semi-finals
The semi-final winners qualified for the 2008 Summer Olympics.

Third place play-off

Final

Statistics

Goalscorers

4 goals 
  Freddy Adu

3 goals
  Will Johnson

2 goals
  Edwin Aguilar
  Tosaint Ricketts
  Leonel Saint-Preux
  Hendry Thomas
  Luis Ángel Landín

Awards
The following awards were given at the conclusion of the tournament.

Final ranking

Qualified teams for Summer Olympics
The following two teams from CONCACAF qualified for the 2008 Summer Olympics.

1 Bold indicates champions for that year. Italic indicates hosts for that year.

Cuban defections
Following the Cuban draw against the United States, seven Cuban players defected, leaving the team with only 11 players which was reduced to 10 against Honduras. Cuba played its final game against Panama with no players available as substitutes because Roberto Linares was sent off from Cuba's match against the United States causing him to be automatically suspended for the team's next match.

References

External links
 CONCACAF.com - 2008 CONCACAF Men's Olympic Qualification

 
Football qualification for the 2008 Summer Olympics
2008
CONCACAF Men's Olympic Qualifying Tournament
Oly
CONCACAF Men's Pre-Olympic Tournament
CONCACAF Men's Pre-Olympic Tournament
CONCACAF Men's Pre-Olympic Tournament